Stare is the third album by Russian rock band Gorky Park, released in 1996, originally under Nox Music in Russia.

Background 
Before recording the album, the band began touring followed by Russia in 1994. The following year, they focus at their new studio in Los Angeles with new songs composed, many of them written by the duo of Alain Johannes and Natasha Shneider from Eleven band.

Shortly before the recording began, the band incorporates a keyboardist, Nikolai Kuzminih, due to the evolution to a more progressive rock style.  At the same time, they invited English session guitarist Allan Holdsworth and drummer Ron Powel. Back in Russia, the mix was made by Erwin Musper at the GDRZ Studio-5 with the Moscow Philharmonic Orchestra.

The third album was released on May 20, 1996, followed by a great tour by Russia, featuring an image and sound more mature and contemporary. However, the album was a resounding commercial failure outside their native country, in a world dominated by other musical genres.

Four music videos was made for  the album: "Stare",  "Stop the World I Want to Get Off", "Ocean" and "Scared", which was directed by Sergei Bazhenov.

Track listing

Personnel 
 Band members
 Alexandre "Big Sasha" Minkov — lead vocals, bass guitar
 Alexei Belov — guitar, keyboards, backing vocals
 Alexandre "Jan" Janenkov (Alexander "Yan" Yanenkov) — guitar
 Alexandre "Little Sasha" Lvov — drums
Nikolai Kuzminih - keyboards 
Additional musicians
 Allan Holdsworth - guitar [Solo] (track # 7)
 Dorothy Colman - harmonica (tracks # 8, 11)
 Dorothy Colman, Ester Nicholson,  Latonya Reed - backing vocals (track # 5)
Ron Powel - percussion
Moscow Philharmonic Orchestra - orchestral arrangements

References

External links 
Discogs.com

1996 albums
Gorky Park (band) albums